Keayodendron is a genus of plants in the family Phyllanthaceae first described as a genus in 1959. It contains only one known species, Keayodendron bridelioides, native to tropical western and Central Africa (Ghana, Cote d’Ivoire, Nigeria, Cameroon, Gabon, the Republic of the Congo, and the Central African Republic). It is dioecious, with male and female flowers on separate plants.

References

Phyllanthaceae
Phyllanthaceae genera
Monotypic Malpighiales genera
Dioecious plants